Stropharia rugosoannulata, commonly known as the wine cap stropharia, "garden giant", burgundy mushroom or king stropharia (Japanese: saketsubatake), is an agaric of the family Strophariaceae found in Europe and North America, and introduced to Australia and New Zealand. The mushroom was reported in April 2018 in Colombia, in the city of Bogota.
Unlike many other members of the genus Stropharia, it is regarded as a choice edible and is commercially cultivated.

The king stropharia can grow to 20 cm high with a reddish-brown convex to flattening cap up to 30 cm across, the size leading to another colloquial name godzilla mushroom. The gills are initially pale, then grey, and finally dark purple-brown in colour. The firm flesh is white, as is the tall stem which bears a wrinkled ring. This is the origin of the specific epithet which means "wrinkled-ringed".

It is found on wood chips across North America in summer and autumn. Described as very tasty by some authors, king stropharia is easily cultivated on a medium similar to that on which it grows naturally. Antonio Carluccio recommends sautéeing them in butter or grilling them.

In Paul Stamets' book Mycelium Running, a study done by Christiane Pischl showed that the king stropharia makes an excellent garden companion to corn.  The fungus also has a European history of being grown with corn.

A 2006 study, published in the journal Applied and Environmental Microbiology, found the king stropharia to have the ability to attack the nematode Panagrellus redivivus; the fungus produces unique spiny cells called acanthocytes which are able to immobilise and digest the nematodes. See nematophagous fungus.

Legal Status
It is illegal to grow or sell Stropharia species, including king stropharia, for human consumption in the US state of Louisiana.

References

Further reading
 Zadrazil, Frantisek and Joachim Schliemann: "Ein Beitrag zur Ökologie und Anbautechnik von Stropharia rugosoannulata (Farlow ex Murr.)" in: Der Champignon Nr.163, March 1975

Strophariaceae
Carnivorous fungi
Edible fungi
Fungi described in 1922
Fungi of New Zealand
Fungi of Europe
Fungi of North America
Fungi in cultivation
Fungal pest control agents